Motherfucker is an English-language vulgarism.

Motherfucker may also refer to:

Up Against the Wall Motherfucker, a 1960s anarchist group
"Motherfucker" (Faith No More song), 2014
"Motherfucker" (Primitive Radio Gods song), 1996
"Motherfucker" (Robbie Williams song), 2016
The Motherfucker, a character from the Kick-Ass 2 comic, 2013